Kevin Callinan (born 1959 or 1960) is an Irish trade unionist.

Callinan grew up in the Northside area of Dublin, and began his working life with Dublin Corporation, as a library assistant.  He joined the Local Government and Public Services Union, and later began working for the union.  When the union became part of the new Irish Municipal, Public and Civil Trade Union (IMPACT), he was steadily promoted until he became deputy general secretary.

In 2018, IMPACT became part of the new Fórsa union, and Callinan continued as deputy general secretary.  The following year, he was elected to the top post of general secretary.  Later in the year, he was also elected as secretary of the public service committee Irish Congress of Trade Unions (ICTU).  He was elected as president of ICTU in 2021, in which post he called for increased wealth taxes to fund improved public services.

Callinan is a fan of Manchester United F.C. and has described Alex Ferguson as one of the people he most admires.

References

Living people
Irish trade unionists
Presidents of the Irish Congress of Trade Unions
Trade unionists from Dublin (city)
Year of birth missing (living people)